The 2012 FIBA Africa Under-18 Championship was the 18th FIBA Africa Under-18 Championship, played under the rules of FIBA, the world governing body for basketball, and the FIBA Africa thereof. The tournament was hosted by Mozambique from August 16 to 25, with the games played at the Pavilhão da Académica in Maputo.

Senegal defeated Ivory Coast 71–62 in the final to win their first title. The tournament qualified both the winner and the runner-up for the 2013 Under-19 World Cup.

Squads

Draw

Preliminary round 
Times given below are in UTC+2.

Group A

Group B

Knockout stage
Championship bracket

5-8th bracket

9th place classification

9-11th place classification

Quarter-finals

9th place match

5–8th place classification

Semifinals

7th place match

5th place match

Bronze medal match

Final

Final standings

Senegal rosterAbdoulaye Dione, Abdoulaye Ndoye, Ibrahima Niang, Khadim Fall, Madiara Dieng, Mouhammad Ndour, Ousseynou Gueye, Pape Diatta, Samba Ndiaye, Seydina Ba, Souleymane Fall, Youssoupha Fall, Coach: Madiene Fall

Awards

All-Tournament Team
  Boubacar Coulibaly
  Ehab Amin
  Kehasson Oulai
  Aboulaye Ndoye
  Moatez Ali

See also
 2011 FIBA Africa Under-16 Championship

External links
Official Website
Sportstats Profile
Scorespro Profile
Afrobasket Profile

References

FIBA Africa Under-18 Championship
2012 in African basketball
Bask
International basketball competitions hosted by Mozambique